Norbertville, Quebec is a former village in Centre-du-Québec, Quebec, Canada. Route 263 goes through it.  Its population was 266 as of the 2006 census.

It was merged into Saint-Norbert-d'Arthabaska as of October 21, 2009.

References

Sources
(Google Maps)

Former municipalities in Quebec
Populated places disestablished in 2009